Paul E. Shepherd (born December 21, 1942) is an American politician and businessman from Idaho. Shepherd is a Republican former member of Idaho House of Representatives for District 7 seat B. His son, Charlie, succeeded in District 7 seat B.

Early life 
On December 21, 1942, Shepherd was born in Boise, Idaho. Shepherd graduated from Boise High School.

Education
Shepherd attended Boise Junior College (later accredited as Boise State University).

Career 
Shepherd is a former Partner/Manager of Shepherd Sawmill and Log Homes Incorporated.

On November 2, 2004, Shepherd won the election and became a member of Idaho House of Representatives for District 8 seat B. Shepherd defeated Charles D. Cuddy with 50.2% of the votes. On November 7, 2006, as an incumbent, Shepherd won the election and continued serving District 8 seat B. Shepherd defeated Charlene Douglas with 61.39% of the votes. On November 4, 2008, as an incumbent, Shepherd won the election and continued serving District 8 seat B. Shepherd defeated Jim Rehder with 58.9% of the votes. On November 2, 2010, as an incumbent, Shepherd won the election and continued serving District 8 seat B. Shepherd defeated Jerry Lockhart with 70.2% of the votes.

On November 6, 2012, Shepherd won the election and became a member of Idaho House of Representatives for District 7 seat B. Shepherd defeated Nancy M. Lerandeau with 67.3% of the votes. On November 4, 2014, as an incumbent, Shepherd won the election and continued serving District 7 seat B. On November 8, 2016, as an incumbent, Shepherd won the election unopposed and continued serving District 7 seat B. On November 6, 2018, as an incumbent, Shepherd won the election unopposed and continued serving District 7 seat B.

Election history

Personal life 
Shepherd's wife is Dawn Shepherd. They have nine children. Shepherd and his family live in Riggins, Idaho. Shepherd is a protestant.

References

External links
Paul E. Shepherd at the Idaho Legislature
 Paul Shepherd at ballotpedia.org

1942 births
Living people
Republican Party members of the Idaho House of Representatives
People from Boise, Idaho
People from Idaho County, Idaho
Boise State University alumni
21st-century American politicians